Eric "Gus" Brock is an American football coach.  Brock was the head football coach for the Haskell Indian Nations University in Lawrence, Kansas for eight seasons, from 2002 until 2009.  His coaching record at Haskell Indian Nations was 22–60.

References

Year of birth missing (living people)
Living people
Haskell Indian Nations Fighting Indians football coaches